Baron Clinton is a title in the Peerage of England. Created in 1298 for Sir John de Clinton, it is the seventh-oldest barony in England.

Creation and early history
The title was granted in 1298 to Sir John de Clinton, a knight who had served in the Scottish and French wars. The peerage was created by writ, which means that it can descend through both male and female lines. It is thus one of the most ancient English titles still in existence.

William, the younger son of the first Baron, was also summoned to parliament by writ on 6 September 1330 as Baron de Clynton, even though his elder brother, the second Baron, was sitting in parliament under the same title. He was created Earl of Huntingdon in 1337.

The second Baron, John, fought with the king's army, which defeated Edward II's cousin Thomas, Earl of Lancaster, at the Battle of Boroughbridge in 1321. He was knighted by 1324. The third Baron fought at the Battle of Poitiers in the Hundred Years' War and was the Constable of Warwick Castle (1390-97). He married at least three times. His first wife, Idonea de Saye, was the daughter of Geoffrey de Saye, 2nd Lord Saye. He was succeeded in the barony by their grandson, son of their son Sir William Clinton (DVP 25 October 1383).

In 1399, upon the death of the fourth Baron's cousin, Elizabeth de Saye de Falvesley Heron, Baroness Saye, the fourth Baron succeeded to the Saye lands and styled himself Lord Saye. He married three times; firstly, to Anne Trivett, daughter of Sir Thomas Trivett; secondly, to Alice or Anne FitzWarin, daughter of the 2nd Baron Botreaux and the widow of the 6th Lord Fitzwarin; and thirdly to Mary Retford, widow of Sir Henry Retford.

He was succeeded by his son from his second marriage. The fifth Baron fought on the Yorkist side in the Wars of the Roses. He was attainted in 1461 but later restored to his title. The sixth Baron was recognised in 1471 as Lord Clinton and Saye, but was not called to Parliament under either title. He married Elisabeth, daughter of Sir Richard Fiennes, and took Fiennes as an alias, and Clinton and Saye baronies continued to be linked for several generations. The 10th and 11th Barons were called to Parliament as Baron Clinton de Saye.

Edward Clinton, 9th Baron Clinton was created Earl of Lincoln in 1572. The titles remained united until 1692 upon the death of his great-great-great-grandson, Edward de Clinton, fifth Earl of Lincoln and 13th Baron Clinton. The earldom was inherited by the late Earl's cousin, the sixth Earl (see the Earl of Lincoln for later history of this title) while the barony fell into abeyance between the issue of his two aunts, Lady Margaret Clinton (d. 1688) and Lady Arabella Clinton, the daughters of Theophilus de Clinton, 4th Earl of Lincoln and 12th Baron Clinton.

Barony into first abeyance
 

The abeyance of 1692 was terminated in 1721 in favour of Hugh Fortescue (d. 1751), fourteenth Baron Clinton, the grandson of Lady Margaret Clinton (d. 1688), the eldest daughter of Theophilus de Clinton, 4th Earl of Lincoln and 12th Baron Clinton (d. 1667). Lady Margaret had married Hugh Boscawen (1625–1701), MP, of Tregothnan in Cornwall, and their daughter Bridget Boscawen (d. 1708) married Hugh Fortescue (1665–1719) (son of Arthur Fortescue by Barbara Elford) and had issue Sir Hugh Fortescue (d. 1751). In 1746, he was created Baron Fortescue, of Castle Hill in the County of Devon (with remainder to his half-brother Matthew Fortescue) and Earl Clinton, with remainder to the heirs male of his body. The Earl was childless and on his death the earldom of Clinton became extinct but his two baronies continued. He was succeeded in the barony of Fortescue (according to the special remainder) by his half-brother, the second Baron Fortescue (see Earl Fortescue for later history of this title). The barony of Clinton  was inherited by his second cousin Margaret Rolle, 15th Baroness Clinton, the granddaughter of  Lady Arabella Clinton, the younger daughter of Theophilus de Clinton, 4th Earl of Lincoln and 12th Baron Clinton (d. 1667). Margaret Rolle was the widow of Robert Walpole, 2nd Earl of Orford (d. 1751) and the  daughter of Samuel Rolle, the son of Robert Rolle (d. 1660), MP, of Heanton Satchville, Devon, by his wife Lady Arabella Clinton. She was succeeded by her son, George Walpole, third Earl of Orford and 16th Baron Clinton (d. 1791). He was childless and on his death in 1791 the earldom passed to his uncle, the fourth Earl of Orford (see the Earl of Orford for later history of this title), while the barony of Clinton became dormant.

Barony dormant
The barony, which had been dormant since 1791, was successfully claimed in 1794 by the late Earl of Orford's cousin Robert George William Trefusis (1764–1797), who became the 17th Baron Clinton. He was the three-times great-grandson of Lady Arabella Clinton, the younger daughter of the fourth Earl of Lincoln. Lady Arabella's daughter Bridget Rolle had married Francis Trefusis of Trefusis in Cornwall, and had issue Samuel Trefusis (1677–1724), whose great-grandson was the 17th Baron Clinton.

The 18th Baron served as aide-de-camp to the Duke of Wellington during the Peninsular War. He was succeeded by his younger brother, who represented Callington in the House of Commons, in which role he was notable.  He was succeeded by his son, the 20th Baron Clinton (1834–1904). He served as Under-Secretary of State for India from 1867 to 1868 in the Conservative administrations of the Earl of Derby and Benjamin Disraeli and was also Lord Lieutenant of Devonshire. In 1867 Baron Clinton assumed by Royal licence the additional surnames of Hepburn-Stuart-Forbes, which were those of his father-in-law. His son, the 21st Baron, held minor office in the coalition government of David Lloyd George and served as Lord Warden of the Stannaries.

Barony into second abeyance
Following the death of the 21st Baron Clinton on 5 July 1957, the barony fell into abeyance between his two daughters: The Hon. Harriet Fane (14 November 1887 – 15 March 1958), who married Maj. Henry Nevile Fane, only son of Sir Edmund Fane  (whom she divorced in 1935); and the Hon. Fenella Bowes-Lyon (19 August 1889 – 19 July 1966), an aunt of Queen Elizabeth II through her marriage to John Bowes-Lyon, second son of the 14th Earl of Strathmore and Kinghorne. The abeyance of 1957 was terminated 18 March 1965 in favour of Gerald Neville Mark Fane Trefusis, the 22nd Lord Clinton, who is the great-grandson of the 21st Baron Clinton and grandson of Hon. Harriet Fane. His great-aunt Fenella supported his eight-year legal fight to succeed as baron. Baron Clinton had already in 1958 assumed by deed poll the additional surname of Trefusis and had inherited the 85,000-acre estate in Devon from his great-grandfather.

Residences
The family seat is Heanton Satchville, Huish, near Merton in North Devon, which was built in 1782 as "Innis House" by James Innis, Duke of Roxburgh, and was purchased by the 18th Baron Clinton in about 1805, renamed Heanton Satchville, which burned down in 1935 and was rebuilt.

After the death of Hon. Mark Rolle in 1907, Bicton House became the main residence of the 21st Baron Clinton until his death in 1957, where much grand entertaining occurred until the start of World War II and where a herd of 150 deer were kept in the park. The Duke and Duchess of York spent part of their honeymoon there.

The 1st Baron resided at Maxstoke Castle, Warwickshire, the inheritance of his wife. The 5th Baron exchanged it for lands in Northamptonshire. The 9th Baron's chief seat was in Lincolnshire on an estate which was the inheritance of his wife Elizabeth Blount. The seat of the 14th Baron Clinton was Castle Hill, Filleigh, rebuilt by him in the Palladian style. The seat of the 15th Baroness was Heanton Satchville, Petrockstowe, the ancient Rolle seat, although she spent the later part of her life on the Continent, having left her first husband, and died in Pisa. Her son the 16th Baron largely abandoned that residence in favour of Houghton Hall in Norfolk. Although he had the legal power to do so, he did not end the tail-male of the Rolle estates, and the estates thus passed to the Trefusis family not to his own heirs male the Lords Cholmondely, heirs to the Walpole estates, who unsuccessfully claimed the Rolle estates from the 18th Baron Clinton in a lengthy court case. Heanton Satchville, Petrockstowe became the seat of the 17th Baron only for a short time as it burnt down in 1795 and he died two years later. His son the 18th Baron when he came of age  purchased Innes House on the other side of a marshy valley in the parish of Huish and renamed it Heanton Satchville.

Barons Clinton (1298)
John Clinton, 1st Baron Clinton (d. 1315)
John Clinton, 2nd Baron Clinton (d. c. 1335)
John Clinton, 3rd Baron Clinton (d. 1398)
William Clinton, 4th Baron Clinton (1378–1431)
John Clinton, 5th Baron Clinton (1410–1464)
John Clinton, 6th Baron Clinton (1431–1488)
John Clinton, 7th Baron Clinton (1471–1514)
Thomas Clinton, 8th Baron Clinton (1490–1517)
Edward Clinton, 9th Baron Clinton (1512–1585) (created Earl of Lincoln in 1572)

Earls of Lincoln (1572)
Edward Clinton, 1st Earl of Lincoln, 9th Baron Clinton (1512–1585)
Henry Clinton, 2nd Earl of Lincoln, 10th Baron Clinton (1541–1616)
Thomas Clinton, 3rd Earl of Lincoln, 11th Baron Clinton (1568–1619)
Theophilus Clinton, 4th Earl of Lincoln, 12th Baron Clinton (1600–1667)
Edward Clinton, 5th Earl of Lincoln, 13th Baron Clinton (d. 1692) (abeyant)

Barons Clinton (1298; reverted)
Hugh Fortescue, 14th Baron Clinton (1696–1751) (abeyance terminated 1721; created Baron Fortescue and Earl Clinton in 1749)

Barons Fortescue and Earls Clinton (1749)
Hugh Fortescue, 1st Earl Clinton, 14th Baron Clinton (1696–1751)  (abeyant 1751)

Barons Clinton (1298; reverted)
Margaret Rolle, 15th Baroness Clinton (1709–1781) (abeyance terminated 1760)
George Walpole, 3rd Earl of Orford, 16th Baron Clinton (1730–1791) (son by mother's 1st marriage) (dormant on his death)
Robert George William Trefusis, 17th Baron Clinton (1764–1797) (cousin) (claimed title 1794)
Robert Cotton St John Trefusis, 18th Baron Clinton (1787–1832) (son)
Charles Rodolph Trefusis, 19th Baron Clinton (1791–1866) (brother)
Charles Henry Rolle Hepburn-Stuart-Forbes-Trefusis, 20th Baron Clinton (1834–1904) (son)
Charles John Robert Hepburn-Stuart-Forbes-Trefusis, 21st Baron Clinton (1863–1957) (son) (abeyant)
Gerard Neville Mark Fane-Trefusis, 22nd Baron Clinton (b. 1934) (born Gerard Fane, eldest daughter's grandson) (abeyance terminated 1965)

The heir apparent is the present holder's son the Hon. Charles Patrick Rolle Fane-Trefusis (b. 1962).

The heir apparent's heir apparent is his son Edward Charles Rolle Fane-Trefusis (b. 1994)

See also
Earl of Lincoln (1572 creation)
Duke of Newcastle-Under-Lyne (1756 creation)
Earl Fortescue
Earl of Orford

References

Further reading
Austin, Anne (1999). History of the Clinton Barony 1299–1999. Exeter: Privately Published.

Baronies in the Peerage of England
Baronies by writ
Baron
1298 establishments in England
 
Noble titles created in 1298